Monija Čebašek (born 11 April 1998) is a Slovenian rhythmic gymnast.

She competed at three World Championships (2013, 2014, 2015). At the 2013 World Championships where she placed 68th All-Around, 75th with Hoop (12.691), 85th with Ball (11.500), 56th with Clubs (13.641) and 56th with Ribbon (13.250). At the 2014 World Championships where she placed 71st All-Around, 69th with Hoop (13.916), 92nd with Ball (13.350) and 65th with Clubs (13.416). At the 2015 World Championships where she placed 107th All-Around, 70th with Hoop (13.908), 128th with Clubs (10.750) and 115th with Ribbon (13.050).

She was named Sportswoman of the Year by the Portorož Chamber of Commerce in January 2014. In May 2015 she was announced as a recipient of the 2015 Young Hope scholarship fund. The fund aims to help young people achieve their goals in the fields of art, science or sport.

Routine music information

References

External links
https://database.fig-gymnastics.com/public/gymnasts/biography/9661/true?backUrl=
 

Living people
1998 births
Sportspeople from Ljubljana
Slovenian rhythmic gymnasts